Microphasmidae is a family of crustaceans belonging to the order Amphipoda.

Genera:
 Microphasma Woltereck, 1909
 Microphasmoides Vinogradov, 1960

References

Amphipoda